Paradise Wildlife Park is a family-run wildlife park and charity located in Broxbourne, Hertfordshire, England. Previously known as Broxbourne Zoo, it was renamed Paradise Wildlife Park after it came under the management of Peter & Grace Sampson family in 1984. In 2017, their daughter Lynn Whitnall became CEO and continued the family business. They became Zoological Society of Hertfordshire (ZSH) in 2017, a registered charity (no.1108609) that works alongside Paradise Wildlife Park. The zoo receives no government funding. Since 2017, it has been named Hertfordshire's best outdoor attraction by TripAdvisor.

The zoo is home to over 800 animals including Amur tigers, white lions, snow leopards, European wolves as well as African penguins, red pandas, Green anacondas, Two-toed sloths, lemurs, meerkats, Bactrian camels, Plain's zebras, Brazilian tapirs and many more.

The wildlife park recently released plans to open a UK first mixed habitat for sun bears, binturongs and Asian short-clawed otters as well as a UK first jaguar habitat for 2021. In 2020, the zoo launched their first TV series; CBBC's One Zoo Three. The TV show followed the daily tasks of Cameron, Tyler and Aaron Whitnall, three brothers who help run both Paradise Wildlife Park and their sister site, The Big Cat Sanctuary in Smarden, Kent.

The park launched "World of Dinosaurs" in 2018, an animatronic dinosaur adventure trail. The trail contains over 30 life-sized animatronic dinosaurs. There is also an outdoor paddling pool, On Safari Adventure Golf, the ‘Rex Express’ train and 5 adventure indoor and outdoor play areas. 

On 4 April 2022, the park announced that it would be rebranding to Hertfordshire Zoo as part of the 40-year anniversary celebrations in 2024.

Animal exhibits

Land of the Tigers
Land of the Tigers opened in 2020 and became the first exhibit in the UK which featured underwater viewing. The exhibit is also the first of its kind in the UK featuring a mixed exhibit of Amur Tigers, Koi and Grass Carp.

Lion Pridelands

Lion Pride-lands opened in 2019 for their pride of white lions. Paradise recently announced it will be moving away from white cats in the next 5 years and move towards a strong focus on conservation.

Rainforest Experience
The indoor exhibit holds various small monkeys including Pygmy Marmosets, Golden Headed Lion Tamarins, Emperor Tamarins and Golden Lion Tamarins, as well as Two-Toed Sloths and Three-Banded Armadillos.

Temple of Angkor
The indoor reptile house was built in 2004 and features various snakes and lizards ranging from Reticulated Pythons and Madagascan Day Geckos to Barons Racer and Black Breasted Leaf Turtle.

Amazon & Beyond
This new build contains the largest Green anaconda on-show in the UK. The indoor exhibit also holds False Water Cobra, Beaded Lizards, Plica-Plica and Piranha.

Penguin Falls
This area launched their charity pillar (ZSH) and the start of the zoo rebuild over the next 10 years.

Sun Bear Heights 
A UK first mixed habitat for sun bears, binturongs and Asian short-clawed otters.

Birds at Paradise 
This area is home to various birds including striated caracara, African spotted eagle owl, great grey owl, black hornbill, kookaburra and many more.

Jaguar Jungle 
A UK first jaguar habitat with underwater viewing and tree-top viewing.

Farmyard 
The farm has a variety of species of farmyard animals, including pygmy goats, sheep, rabbits and ferrets, among others.

World of Dinosaurs 

Opened in 2018, World of Dinosaurs is one of the UK's biggest animatronic dinosaur attractions, set in acres of natural woodland. It features 30 life-size, animatronic, roaring dinosaurs.

History

Broxbourne Zoo 
The park was previously known as Broxbourne Zoo, which opened in the early 1960s.

In 1984, the Sampson Family purchased the site with the intention of re-housing the animals into larger enclosures which mimicked their natural habitat, making them as comfortable as possible. The zoo was closed down for two years to undergo this transformation and re-opened as "Paradise Park and Woodland Zoo", which was then shortened to Paradise Wildlife Park (PWP) in the 1990s.

Since the Sampson family took over the Zoo, the team at PWP have continued researching, expanding and improving upon the animals' living conditions. Paradise Wildlife Park has developed a reputation through its conservation efforts, including The Wildlife Heritage Foundation (the sister site in Kent), which specialises in research and breeding of endangered species.

Continued work and investment to improve the animal enclosures and public facilities and a drive to enhance the public perception of the park continued throughout the 1980s. The second stage of development included building new animal paddocks, improving the pathways, and increasing tree planting around the site.

1980s to 1990s

The Sampson family, now dedicated to the park, chose to sell their "Sampson Coaches and Buses" company in 1989 and "MOT testing centre and garage" in 1990 to allow them to concentrate solely on the management and finance of Paradise Park and Woodland Zoo.

In the early 1990s, the site's name was changed to "Paradise Wildlife Park" and work continued to improve the facilities. New spacious and open enclosures were built alongside "Tiger Lodge", a new purpose built enclosure constructed in 1994 for the zoo's Bengal and Siberian tigers. Improvements were also made to the park's non-animal areas, with three new themed adventure playgrounds introduced. All facilities at the site were given modern renovations, and changes were made to better accommodate and fulfil the needs of people with disabilities.

2000-2017
Paradise Wildlife Park, like many animal attractions in England, was forced to close by the Foot and Mouth epidemic in the spring of 2001.

Work continued on new enclosures for the animals with meerkats, otters, Brazilian tapirs, red pandas and European grey wolves joining the existing collection. Major work was undertaken to create new sections; "Squirrel Monkey Island", "Wonders of the Rainforest", "Cheetah Retreat" and "Toucan House". The Animal Resource Centre (ARC) is a new development which houses a veterinary and recovery room, animal food preparation areas, an animal records and research room, and large staff facilities. There has been extensive work completed on the paddock areas to improve drainage; overflow car parking facilities have been added; and improvements to the water supply were also made. Included in the upgrade were an electricity sub-station and back-up generator. "The Special Place'", a brand new play area adapted for use by children with disabilities, was also added.

In 2000, Parkside Leisure, the parent company of Paradise Wildlife Park, purchased the site of the Big Cat Foundation in Kent, a sanctuary operated at the time by the Born Free Foundation. A new organisation was established by Paradise Wildlife Park called the Wildlife Heritage Foundation (WHF). During 2002 the Born Free Foundation and the Wildlife Heritage Foundation held a joint Dangerous Wild Animals Licence to operate the site. The site is now exclusively operated by the Wildlife Heritage Foundation, (registered charity number 1104420). The objective of the WHF is to support conservation in-situ and ex-situ projects and to assist with endangered species breeding programmes. Paradise Wildlife Park financially supports WHF.

2017 – present 
Since becoming the Zoological Society of Hertfordshire in 2017, (ZSH) a registered charity (no.1108609), Paradise Wildlife Park have invested a lot into the site. The new areas include; Land of the Tigers, Lion Pridelands, Amazon & Beyond, Sun Bear Heights, Jaguar Jungle and World of Dinosaurs. In 2020, the zoo was featured on CBBC's TV series; CBBC's One Zoo Three. The TV show followed the daily lives of Aaron, Tyler & Cameron Whitnall, three brothers who help run both Paradise Wildlife Park and their sister site; The Big Cat Sanctuary in Smarden, Kent.

Animals 
Paradise Wildlife Park is home to over 500 animals, which include small mammals, paddock and farmyard animals, birds, primates, reptiles, and big cats. They house Siberian tigers, snow leopards, ocelot and jaguars. They also house white lions.

Breeding at Paradise Wildlife Park has been successful, with the breeding of endangered species such as marmosets, tamarins, Burmese pythons and lovebirds. Many animals are bred as part of the EEP Breeding Programme.

Animals and wildlife at Paradise Wildlife Park are separated into several attractions including:
 Big Cats

The park contains some of the most endangered big cat species in the world, including the ocelot, snow leopards, jaguars and Amur tigers. They also have white lions but recently announced that they will be moving out of white cats.
 Hooves and Humps
The hooves and humps section houses ungulate animals such as the endangered Bactrian camel, the African plains zebra, the Brazilian tapir and reindeer.
 Farmyard
The zoo has a variety of species of farmyard animals including pygmy goats, sheep, among others.
 Tropical Rainforest
Paradise Wildlife Park is home to the largest collection of small monkeys in the UK in its natural tropical rainforest house, including over 10 species of small monkeys as well as sloths, armadillos and several other tropical creatures.
 Angkor reptile temple
The Angkor Reptile Temple houses the largest Anaconda in the UK named Optimus Prime. The zoo also has over 35 different species of snakes, lizards and spiders.
 Birds & aviary
The section contains owls, eagles and many other species of birds.
 Small mammals
Houses a collection of small mammals including porcupines, meerkats, red pandas, otter and wallabies.

The Big Cat Sanctuary 
On 1 June 2000, Parkside Leisure, the parent company of Paradise Wildlife Park ran by Peter Sampson, purchased the site of Marley Farm in Kent, a sanctuary operated at the time by Malcom Dudding and the Born Free Foundation. A new organisation was established by Paradise Wildlife Park called the Wildlife Heritage Foundation (WHF). During 2002 the Born Free Foundation and the Wildlife Heritage Foundation held a joint Dangerous Wild Animals Licence to operate the site. The site is now exclusively operated by the Wildlife Heritage Foundation (registered charity number 1104420). The objective of the WHF is to support conservation in-situ and ex-situ projects and to assist with endangered species breeding programmes. Paradise Wildlife Park financially supports WHF.

References

External links

 http://whf.org.uk/
Paradise Wildlife Park

Broxbourne
Tourist attractions in Hertfordshire
Zoos in England
Buildings and structures in Hertfordshire